123 km is a rural locality (a passing loop) in Osinogrivskoye Rural Settlement of Topkinsky District, Russia. The population was 29 .

Geography 
The passing loop is located on the Yurga-Tashtagol line, 30 km south of Topki (the district's administrative centre) by road. Znamensky is the nearest rural locality.

Streets 
 Zheleznodorozhnaya

References 

Rural localities in Kemerovo Oblast